Vanduzea is a genus of treehoppers in the family Membracidae. There are about 12 described species in Vanduzea.

Species
These 12 species belong to the genus Vanduzea:

 Vanduzea albifrons Fowler c g
 Vanduzea arquata Say c g b (black locust treehopper)
 Vanduzea brunnea Fowler c g
 Vanduzea decorata Funkhouser c g
 Vanduzea laeta Goding, 1894 c g b
 Vanduzea mayana Funkhouser c g
 Vanduzea minor Fowler c g
 Vanduzea punctipennis Funkhouser c g
 Vanduzea segmentata (Fowler, 1895) c g b (Van duzee treehopper)
 Vanduzea testudinea Haviland c g
 Vanduzea triguttata Burmeister c g b (three-spotted treehopper)
 Vanduzea variegata Fowler c g

Data sources: i = ITIS, c = Catalogue of Life, g = GBIF, b = Bugguide.net

References

Further reading

External links

 

Smiliinae
Auchenorrhyncha genera